"Couldn't I Just Tell You" is a song written by American musician Todd Rundgren that was released on his 1972 album Something/Anything?. In July, it was released as a single and reached number 93 on the Billboard Pop Singles chart. The song is considered influential to the development of the power pop genre.

Unlike most of Something/Anything?, which consists primarily of piano-based compositions, "Couldn't I Just Tell You" is a rock song. Rundgren reflected that there would have been more songs in this style if he had not been performing all the music by himself: "I was pretty happy with the song because I realized it was the kind of thing I would probably have done more of if I had been using other players."

Legacy
On a television performance in 1978, Rundgren introduced "Couldn't I Just Tell You" as a part of "the latest musical trend, power pop." The song became influential to artists in the genre.  Music journalist Paul Lester called the recording a "masterclass in compression" and said that Rundgren "staked his claim to powerpop immortality [and] set the whole ball rolling". Musician Scott Miller's 2010 book Music: What Happened? calls the song "likely the greatest power pop recording ever made," with lyrics "somehow both desperate and lighthearted at the same time," and a guitar solo having "truly amazing dexterity and inflection." VH1 named "Couldn't I Just Tell You" at eighth in their list "Catchy, Loud and Proud: 20 Essential Power Pop Tracks That Will Be Stuck In Your Head Forever." Music critic Stephen Thomas Erlewine on AllMusic called the song "terrific power pop classic" and "blinding power pop."

Personnel
 Todd Rundgren – all instruments and vocals

Charts

References

1972 songs
Songs written by Todd Rundgren
Todd Rundgren songs
Power pop songs
Jangle pop songs